...What Remains is the second album by the Christian rock band Spoken. The album is a combination of "rap meets metal, and a bit of melodic rock"

Track listing

A secret song, a comedic take on the song "So Far From God" with Matt Baird singing "I am a Rock Star" can be found 6:06 into the 14th track "People Get Ready, Jesus Is Comin'".

References

Spoken (band) albums
1999 albums